Santiago Blanco Gil (born 13 June 1974 in Puerto de Béjar) is a former Spanish racing cyclist.

Major results

1994
Vuelta a Navarra
1995
Vuelta a Castilla y León
1st stage Colorado Classic
1997
2nd and 3rd stages Euskal Bizikleta
3rd stage Vuelta a La Rioja
3rd Paris–Nice
1998
4th stage Vuelta a Asturias
3rd Vuelta a Asturias
3rd Route du Sud
1999
Subida al Naranco
3rd Vuelta a Andalucía
10th Vuelta a España
2000
4th stage Vuelta a Andalucía
2001
10th stage Vuelta a España
2nd Spanish National Road Race Championships
2002
18th stage Vuelta a España

References

1974 births
Living people
Spanish male cyclists
Sportspeople from the Province of Salamanca
Cyclists from Castile and León